Cone snail is a generic term referring to a number of different genera and families of sea snails with conical shells.

Genera
Conus, a large genus of small to large predatory sea snails, marine gastropod molluscs
Californiconus, a genus of sea snails, marine gastropod mollusks
Profundiconus, a genus of sea snails, marine gastropod mollusks in the family Conidae
Conasprella, a genus of sea snails, marine gastropod mollusks in the family Conidae
Telescopium (gastropod), a genus of sea snails, marine gastropod mollusks in the family Potamididae

Families
Conidae, a taxonomic grouping of predatory sea snails, marine gastropod molluscs in the superfamily Conoidea
Coninae, a taxonomic group of small to large predatory sea snails with cone-shaped shells, marine gastropod mollusks in the superfamily Conoidea